The Congressional Award is an award for young Americans, established by the United States Congress in 1979 to "recognize initiative, service, and achievement in young people." It is nonpartisan, voluntary, non-competitive, and open to all youth ages 13 ½ to 24.

The Congressional Award recognizes the setting and meeting of goals in four program areas: voluntary public service, personal development, physical fitness, and expedition/exploration. Based on time commitments to each of the areas, participants earn bronze, silver, or gold Congressional Award certificates and bronze, silver, or gold Congressional Award medals.

The Congressional Award was written into law on November 16, 1979, by Public Law 96-114, The Congressional Award Act. The enabling legislation was sponsored by Senator Malcolm Wallop of Wyoming and Congressman James J. Howard of New Jersey.

The Congressional Award is a public–private partnership officially registered as a 501(c) non-profit organization, funded entirely by private-sector donations. As a legal entity, the award is a public–private partnership, and its status as a nonprofit organization makes it Congress's only charity.

As of September 2011, according to the Congressional Award Foundation, more than 50,000 youths had registered as participants.

The Congressional Award is one of Congress's two awards specifically for youth, the other being the Congressional Medal of Merit.

The Congressional Award program 

After a youth has registered for the program, either online or via mail, they receive a record book to record their progress in the program’s four key program areas: voluntary public service, personal development, physical fitness, and expedition/exploration.

All youth must register with the Congressional Award to receive their official record books, which must be completed and submitted to earn the award. When a youth has achieved their goals in each program area, and met the necessary requirements for each, they then submit the completed record book to the national office where it is reviewed. The youth will then be notified either that they have been approved, or that they need to provide additional information. The national office works with each youth individually.

The four program areas
The four key program areas of the Congressional Award are voluntary public service, personal development, physical fitness, and expedition/exploration. The emphasis on four diverse program areas is intended to mold a well-rounded youth. These areas resemble those of the Duke of Edinburgh Award.

Voluntary public service 

Sharing time and talents for the benefit of others is an important part of the Congressional Award program. This requires sensitivity, perception of need, determination, perseverance and dedication. Voluntary Public Service activities must be performed without pay, compensation or school credit. Service provided to fulfill graduation requirements may be allowed. Youth should provide a direct service, rather than focus on issues. When setting your goals, identify activities that benefit the community at large. Youth may submit a maximum of four different goals (See Goals) per Record Book for Voluntary Public Service.

Personal development 

The purpose of the personal development category is to expand youths’ horizons while developing individual interests, social and life skills. The Congressional Award challenges youth to pursue a new interest or advance to a higher level in an ongoing interest through Personal Development activities. Youth may submit a maximum of two different goals per record book for personal development.

Physical fitness 

Physical well-being is another important part of the Congressional Award. The purpose is for youth to improve their quality of life through participation in fitness activities. The Congressional Award challenges youth to set and achieve a measurable physical fitness goal. Goals can involve an activity that the youth has never attempted before or it can be a continuation of a familiar activity at a higher level. Both team sports and individual activities are acceptable so long as the activities lead to an improved performance or greater physical health. Gym class is not acceptable for physical fitness. Youth may submit a maximum of two different goals per record book for physical fitness.

Expedition/exploration 

The Congressional Award allows youth to choose between an expedition or an exploration. The aim of an expedition or exploration should be to develop a spirit of adventure and discovery. Organizing, planning, training and completing the expedition or exploration requires self-reliance, determination, and cooperation.

The expedition or exploration is a one-time experience that youth plan and execute themselves. It is not an event planned by someone else that youth attend. "Sign up and go" activities such as jamborees, conferences, sport and summer camps, leadership workshops, cruises, college visits, mission trips, competitions, retreats, and orientations are not appropriate for the Congressional Award expedition/exploration. Youth should learn to be responsible for themselves while learning more about our world through first-hand experience in the wilderness or in a new and different culture. Activities completed on an expedition or exploration may only be counted in the expedition/exploration category of the award—activities completed on an expedition or exploration cannot be counted toward voluntary public service, personal development, or physical fitness.

Expeditions are typically outdoor excursions that include camping, hiking, and wilderness or outdoor activities. This activity usually compels youth to forgo the comforts of home and learn to pack and prepare equipment, set up a tent, and cook food without modern conveniences. Youth may choose to incorporate a scientific study into their expedition like completing a wildlife survey while on a backpacking trip in a national park or searching for signs of prehistoric life in a remote area.

Explorations are trips that provide youth with a new cultural experience. These may include living on a farm, traveling to a foreign country, visiting a historical site, or exploring a new environment. Explorations involve preliminary research and preparation. Challenges may include language barriers, traveling great distances, or learning new skills.

Values-added partnerships 

The Congressional Award is a values-added program, meaning that youth can count many of the activities they are already involved with toward portions of the Congressional Award. This option has been further enriched through the Congressional Award Foundation's partnerships with various youth-related programs.

Activities that can count toward portions of the Congressional Award include:
 4-H
 AmeriCorps NCCC
 ASPCA
 Big Brothers Big Sisters of America
 Boys & Girls Clubs of America
 Boy Scouts of America
 Civil Air Patrol
 Girl Scouts of the USA
 Habitat for Humanity
 High school or college sports/clubs outside of the regular school day
 HOBY
 People to People International
 Red Cross
 YMCA

Although youth can apply their time in these programs toward the Congressional Award, youth cannot count hours from before their registration. The Congressional Award is not about recognizing past accomplishments, but about goal-setting and achieving those goals.

Goals 

Youth complete the program through the pursuit and achievement of goals set entirely by themselves. Goals should be broad statements of what youth hope to achieve. Similar activities may be combined to achieve one goal. Youth often set “umbrella goals” —activities that have an underlying connection or similarity— that helps achieve to allow themselves the freedom to complete more than one activity in pursuit of their goal. Goals should not be too broad, however. They must meet the requirements in the Record Book— they need to be worthwhile, measurable, challenging, fulfilling and achievable. Advisors and Validators assist in the goal-setting process.

Month and hour requirements 

The Congressional Award requires youth to complete a set number of hours in each program area, varying on the certificate or medal level being pursued. Youth work at their own pace and may begin at any level. Youth earn all previous awards if they earn any higher levels. 

No partial awards are given; youth must complete each of the four program area requirements for each level (i.e.- youth cannot, for example, earn a bronze medal in personal development and a silver medal in physical fitness).

In addition to hour requirements, the Congressional Award also has set minimum months of activity needed for each of the main three program areas. The month requirements are meant to foster a lifestyle of service, rather than a short time of volunteerism.

Certificate levels
{| class="wikitable"
|-
! Minimum hours by program area
! Bronze
! Silver
! Gold
|-
| Voluntary public service
| 30
| 60
| 90
|-
| Personal development
| 15
| 30
| 45
|-
| Physical fitness
| 15
| 30
| 45
|-
| Expedition or exploration (days)
| 1
| 2
| 3
|-
| Total minimum hours
| 60
| 120
| 180
|-
| Total minimum months of activity needed(for each of the main three program areas)
| N/A
| N/A
| 6
|}

Medal levels
{| class="wikitable"
|-
! Minimum hours by program area
! Bronze
! Silver
! Gold
|-
| Voluntary public service
| 100
| 200
| 400
|-
| Personal development
| 50
| 100
| 200
|-
| Physical fitness
| 50
| 100
| 200
|-
| Expedition or exploration
| 1 Night / 2 Days
| 2 Nights / 3 Days
| 4 Nights / 5 Days
|-
| Total minimum hours
| 200
| 400
| 800
|-
| Total minimum months of activity needed(for each of the main three program areas)
| 7
| 12
| 24
|}

Congressional Award national events
The Congressional Award is a 501(c)(3), non-profit organization that does not receive any funding from the federal government. Instead they hold several fundraising events to support the program, most notably: The Congressional Award Chiefs of Staff Annual Golf Classic and The Congressional Award Chiefs of Staff Charity Poker Event.
The Congressional Awards' largest event is the annual gold medal ceremony, held in the US Capitol. The June ceremony celebrates the accomplishments of gold medalists, bringing them together from across the country for a presentation of their Congressional Award gold medal by their member of Congress. Due to the large number of medalists, there are usually two ceremonies on Capitol Hill on the gold medal day.

Accompanying the gold medal ceremony is the gold nation experience, an opportunity for gold medalists to create new relationships with other outstanding youth from across the country. The optional program provides medalists with an opportunity to come to Washington, D.C., and see the city together. The gold nation experience usually runs from the week of the gold ceremony until the day after. The cost of the gold nation experience is greatly discounted to medalists due to the fundraising efforts of the Congressional Award Foundation. However, medalists must provide their own transportation to Washington. The gold medal ceremony also commemorates adults and their participation in youth fund raising and volunteering.

History
The Congressional Award was created in 1979 with the passage of the Congressional Award Act.  Since then, the Act has had to be reauthorized to extend the Act's termination date.  On July 23, 2013, Senator Tom Carper (D-DE) introduced the Congressional Award Program Reauthorization Act of 2013 which would again extend the termination date of the program, pushing it from October 1, 2013, to October 1, 2018.

According to the Congressional Budget Office's report on S. 1348, the Congressional Award Foundation received no federal appropriated funds, but did receive free office space in a Congressional office building and did not have to pay for the medals produced by the U.S. Mint.

On September 24, 2018, Rep. David Brat (R-VA) introduced H.R. 6862: Congressional Award Program Reauthorization Act of 2018.  On September 26, 2018, Sen. Michael Enzi (R-WY) introduced S. 2309, the corresponding Senate bill.  On October 11, 2018, President Donald Trump signed S. 3509, which retroactively reauthorizes the Congressional Award Board, effective October 1, 2018, until October 1, 2023, which administers the Congressional Awards Program.

Other awards

The Horizon Award 

The Horizon Award  is a special recognition from the Joint Leadership Commission of the Congressional Award Foundation and its board of directors. The Horizon Award is presented to individuals from the private sector who have contributed to expanding opportunities for all Americans through their own personal contributions, and who have set exceptional examples for young people through their own successes in life. These recipients have truly forged ahead, establishing noble horizons to which our youth can aspire.

Past recipients include:
 1997 Jimmy Smits, Tom Selleck
 1998 Leeza Gibbons, David Frost, Grant Hill
 1999 Mariah Carey, Judith Hale
 2000 Bob Lanier
 2001 Esai Morales
 2002 Arnold Schwarzenegger, Wynton Marsalis, Jerry Blavat
 2003 Art Monk, Charles Mann
 2007 Lauren Nelson
 2008 Drew Brees, Dwayne Johnson
 2009 Nick Cannon, Jimmie Lee Solomon
 2010 Michael Oher
 2011 Dominique Dawes
 2012 Dikembe Mutombo, Debbie Dingell
 2013 Patrick Ewing, Tony Horton
 2014 Kevin Liles
 2015 Steve Pemberton
 2016 America Ferrera, Cal Ripken Jr.
 2017 Chris Doleman
 2018 Curtis Martin

The Wallop Howard Leadership Award 

The Wallop Howard Leadership Award is presented annually to individuals in the public sector who have displayed outstanding commitment to improving the lives of America's young people and providing critical support in the Congressional Award Foundation’s efforts to make the Congressional Award a national opportunity. The Leadership Award is presented by the Congressional Award Joint Leadership Commission, composed of The Speaker and Minority Leader of the House and Majority and Minority Leaders of the Senate.

Past recipients include:
 1994 President and Mrs. Jimmy Carter, Senator Malcolm Wallop, Congressman James Howard
 1995 Congressman John Glenn, Congressman Tom Bliley
 1996 His Royal Highness Prince Philip, Senator Mark Hatfield
 1997 Senator Bob Dole, Congressman Esteban Torres
 1998 Senator Robert Byrd, Congressman Dan Schaefer
 1999 Secretary of State Colin Powell, Judith McHale
 2000 First Lady Nancy Reagan, Congressman Charles Rangel
 2001 Congressman Donald Payne
 2002 Congressman Major Owens
 2003 Congressional Award Chairman Thomas Campbell
 2006 Congressman Ed Pastor
 2007 Senator Mike Enzi, Congressman Rush Holt
 2008 Senator and Mrs. Trent Lott, First Lady Laura Bush
 2009 Congressman Chris Shays
 2010 Senator John Culver
 2011 Governor Dirk Kempthorne, Senator David Pryor
 2012 Senator Bob Bennett
 2013 Senator Alan Simpson, Dr. Francis Collins
 2014 Hon. Ray LaHood
 2015 Hon. John Dingell, Hon. Phil Gramm, Secretary Ron Kirk
 2016 Secretary William Coleman Jr., Secretary Norman Mineta

The Inspiration Award
The Inspiration Award is given to a Congressional Award Advisor who motivates, inspires and leads America’s youth to greatness.

Adult volunteers
Adult volunteers are an integral component of the Congressional Award. More than 10,000 adult volunteers dedicate thousands of hours to promoting a lifestyle of service.

The Congressional Award is designed to bridge the gap between adolescence and adulthood. Working with adults is one way by which participants can achieve this. Most participants will work with five or more adults throughout the program: one advisor and four validators.

Advisors
Each youth selects one adult to serve as their advisor. Teachers, neighbors, clergy, and coaches are examples of possible advisors. The youth may select any adult to be their advisor, so long as the advisor is not a relative or a peer. The advisor meets regularly with the youth to assist him or her in goal-setting and completing the record book. The advisor must sign the youth’s record book prior to submission to the Congressional Award Foundation for review.

Validators
Validators assist the participant with individual activities within a particular program area. Validators should be knowledgeable and/or experienced in the activity being pursued. For example, if a youth’s goal and activities involved basketball, a basketball coach would make a suitable validator. Similarly, if a youth volunteers at an animal shelter, a senior employee or the volunteer coordinator would be an appropriate validator. An advisor can also serve as a validator. While not particularly common, this is appropriate if a suitable validator cannot be found.

In addition to advisors and validators, countless adult volunteers promote the Congressional Award Program throughout the country.

The Congressional Award Foundation
The Congressional Award Foundation is the non-profit entity that oversees the distribution of The Congressional Award on behalf of Congress.

Board of directors 

The Congressional Award Foundation's 48-member board of directors is partially appointed by the joint leadership of both parties in the House of Representatives and the Senate. In addition to actively promoting the Congressional Award Program across the country, the board meets quarterly to assess the program’s growth and provide direction to the national staff.

National/appointed members denoted by asterisk (*)

Executive officers

 Chairman of the Board – Paxton K. Baker*, Washington Nationals
 Vice Chairman – Shawn Whitman, FMC Corporation
 Vice Chairman – The Honorable Rodney E. Slater, Squire Patton Boggs, LLP
 Secretary – Cheryl Maddox*, Kentucky
 Treasurer – Lee Klumpp, CPA, BDO USA

Board members

 Marc Baer* – VP, Health Services, Blue Cross Blue Shield of Minnesota
 Simeon Banister – Commercial Real Estate Appraiser with Midland Appraisal Associates, Inc. Rochester, New York
 Edward Blansitt, III – Inspector General, Montgomery County, Maryland
 Andy Blocker – Head of U.S. Government Affairs for Invesco
 Romero Brown* – CEO, Container Garden Club
 Anne Oswalt Bruce – Senior Director, Federal Affairs, Johnson & Johnson
 Nick Cannon* – California
 Edward Cohen – Principal, Lerner Enterprises
 Anthony Crowell – Dean & President, New York Law School
 Kathy Didawick – VP, Congressional & Political Affairs, Blue Cross Blue Shield Association
 The Honorable Debbie Dingell* – U.S. Representative, MI-12
 Mitchell Draizin* – Founder & President, Longview Capital Advisors
 David Falk – Founder, F.A.M.E.
 Beverly Gilyard – Director of Federal Strategy, AARP
 Patrick Gliha – Director, Federal Government Relations, Celgene
 George B. Gould – Washington, DC
 Dr. Larry Green – Maryland
 J. Steven Hart, Esq.* – Williams & Jensen, P.C.
 Jonathan Heafitz – Assistant VP, Federal Affairs, PCMA
 Erica Wheelan Heyse – National Director, The Congressional Award
 Jesse Hill – Director of Regulatory Relations, Edward Jones
 The Honorable Richard Hudson* – U.S. Representative, NC-08
 David W. Hunt, Esq.* – Legal Counsel
 The Honorable Johnny Isakson* – U.S. Senator, Georgia
 Dr. Brian Johnson – President & CEO, Advance Higher Ed
 Karlos Lasane* – VP, Government Relations, Caesars Entertainment
 Christopher Leahy – VP & Head of Government Relations & Policy, Bayer
 The Honorable Sheila Jackson Lee – U.S. Representative, TX-18
 Mateo Magdaleno* – Chief Education Officer, IDQ Group
 The Honorable Joe Manchin* – U.S. Senator, West Virginia
 Lance Mangum – Senior Federal Affairs Representative, FedEx
Dr. Linda Mitchell  – MSU Extension
 Kim Norman* – Co-Owner/Consultant, G2 Secure Staff
 Laura O'Connor* – Junior High Registrar, Alpine School District
 Michael Pitts* – Wisconsin
 Steven Roberts* – Founder & President, The Roberts Companies
 Beth Ann Ruoff – member of Ogilvy PR’s Strategy and Planning Group, Washington, DC
 David Schiappa* – Partner, The Duberstein Group
 Karen Sessions – VP of Millennium Challenge Corporation, Texas
 Michael Skahill – VP, Government Affairs, Smithfield Foods
 Chris Spear – President & CEO, American Trucking Associations
 Will Stute – Partner, McDermott Will & Emery, LLP
 Chiling Tong* – President & CEO, National ACE
 Jason Van Pelt* – Executive VP, Crossroads Strategies
 Rita Vaswani* – VP & Relationship Manager, Nevada State Bank
 Kathryn Weeden* – United States Senate Page School
 Shawn Whitman – VP, Government Affairs, FMC Corporation

National staff 

The Congressional Award national office is located on Capitol Hill and oversees the day-to-day operations of the Congressional Award Foundation. To better meet the needs of youth, states are assigned to a geographical region—North, South, or West—with a designated program manager. The program managers work closely with advisors and youth in their region to answer any program-related questions and promote the program in their respective region.<ref></php></ref>

 Erica Heyse – National Director
 Derek Doyle – Director of Communications and Strategic Outreach
 Kirsten Gooden – Program Director
 Molly Geiser – Senior Program Manager
 Matt Tick – Program Manager
Bethie Woodall – Program Manager

Past financial uncertainty
The Congressional Award Foundation did experience a brief period of financial uncertainty. In a GAO audit of the Congressional Award Foundation’s 2005 and 2006 financial statements, the office identified
two significant matters related to the Foundation’s financial statements. These matters concerned (1) the Foundation's ability to continue as a going concern, which has been resolved, and (2) inconsistency between functional expenses reported in the Foundation’s annual information return (Form 990) filed with the Internal Revenue Service (IRS) and the audited financial statements for fiscal year 2005.

The first "significant" matter referred to various problems, including a serious decline in the Foundation's assets:  as of September 30, 2006 the value of the Foundation's asset had declined to under $8,500.  Within a year, the asset value had grown to $125,000.  The GAO also noted that the Foundation's national director paid over $23,000 to cover the costs of the Foundation's gold award ceremony during the Foundation's 2006 fiscal year; she was reimbursed for all but $664 by December 2006.

The inconsistency described in the second matter was resolved in the Form 990 and audited financial statements for fiscal year 2006.

Congress created the Congressional Award Fellowship Trust in 1990 to "benefit the charitable and educational purposes of the Foundation"; the Foundation withdrew $20,000 from the trust in order to support its 2007 operations.

The Congressional Award has enjoyed financial stability in the subsequent years, and its proactive fundraising initiatives are working to ensure that it will never again face a budget shortfall.

References

External links 

 Official website
 Congressional Award Act
 Congressional Award Program Reauthorization Act of 2009
 Congressional Award Program Reauthorization Act of 2013
 Congressional Award Program Reauthorization Act of 2018

Awards by age of recipient
Non-profit organizations based in Washington, D.C.
Civil awards and decorations of the United States